Coenen  is a Dutch patronymic surname meaning "son of Coen" (Conrad). It is particularly common in Dutch and Belgian Limburg. Variant spellings are Coene, Koenen and Koene. Though probably with the same origin, the names "de Coene" and "de Koene" can be interpreted as meaning "the brave".

People with this surname include:

 (1514–1587), Dutch fisherman and amateur biologist
Annemie Coenen (born 1978), Belgian singer, producer and composer
Davy Coenen (1980–2010), Belgian mountain biker
Dan Coenen, American legal scholar
Dennis Coenen (born 1991), Belgian road bicycle racer
(1826–1904), Dutch composer and violinist
Jo Coenen (born 1949), Dutch architect and urban planner
Johan Coenen (born 1979), Belgian road bicycle racer
Laura Coenen (born 1962), American handball player
Marcel Coenen (born 1972), Dutch rock guitarist
Marloes Coenen (born 1981), Dutch mixed martial artist
Nathan Coenen (born 1992), Australian actor

Coene
Constantinus Fidelio Coene (1780–1841), Flemish painter
Eline Coene (born 1964), Dutch badminton player
Jacques Coene (died 1411), Flemish painter, illustrator, and architect
Jan Coene (born 1957), Belgian businessman
Luc Coene (born 1947), Belgian economist
De Coene
Jean Henri De Coene (1798–1866), Belgian painter

See also
 Koenen/Koene, surname
 Koen, surname and given name
 Coen (name), surname and given name

References

Dutch-language surnames
Patronymic surnames